William Innes may refer to:
 William T. Innes, American aquarist and author
 William Innes (Australian politician), member of the New South Wales Legislative Council
 William Innes (merchant), British merchant and politician
 Sir William Innes, 8th Baronet (died 1817), of the Innes baronets